The 2016–17 Biathlon World Cup – World Cup 5 was held in Ruhpolding, Germany, from 11 January until 15 January 2017.

Schedule of events

Medal winners

Men

Women

Achievements

 Best performance for all time

 , 16th place in Sprint
 , 38th place in Sprint
 , 3rd place in Pursuit
 , 7th place in Sprint and 5th in Pursuit
 , 28th place in Sprint
 , 10th place in Pursuit
 , 22nd place in Pursuit
 , 40th place in Pursuit

 First World Cup race

 , 72nd place in Sprint
 , 45th place in Sprint

References 

2016–17 Biathlon World Cup
Biathlon
January 2017 sports events in Europe
2017 in Bavaria
Biathlon competitions in Germany
Sports competitions in Bavaria